Triumph Films (also known as Triumph Releasing Corporation) was an American independent film studio division of Sony Pictures Entertainment that geared towards theatre and direct-to-video film production and distribution.

History
It was founded in 1982 as a joint venture between Columbia Pictures and the French company Gaumont to distribute foreign films in the US. In 1984, Marcie Bloom, who was formerly of the New York Film Festival joined Triumph Films to serve as New York publicity director of the film studio.

In 1985, Triumph Films announced that they would cut back down on the production slate, and decided to focus on titles only on foreign-language films with English subtitles. Shortly afterwards, Gaumont decided to cut their ties on the distributing company, and decided that Columbia would be sole owner of the studio. On October 29, 1985, Columbia Pictures decided to shut the foreign film label Triumph Films, and folded into the Columbia Pictures label.

On January 5, 1988, Columbia Pictures Entertainment announced that they would revive the Triumph brand as a new worldwide subsidiary, Triumph Releasing Corporation, and named Patrick N. Williamson as president of the unit, and the company will provide administrative services related to distribution of Columbia Pictures and Tri-Star Pictures in the U.S. and Canada, while internationally, Triumph would be responsible for the sales, marketing and distribution of Columbia and Tri-Star films under the direction of each individual studio. It was officially incorporated on March 24, 1988. In 1989, Triumph distributed films by Crédit Lyonnais's Epic Productions Inc. (Not to be confused with Epic Records).

On November 23, 1994, Triumph Releasing Corporation was renamed as Sony Pictures Releasing Corporation, and the Triumph name was spun off as Triumph Films. After being shut down in 1997, the Triumph Films label was re-activated in 2003. Eventually, the label turned dormant in 2008 and became an in-name-only division of Sony Pictures Releasing Corporation. In 2014, the label was revived yet again for the release of The Remaining.

Notable films
Notable films include To Gillian on Her 37th Birthday, The Ambulance, Brainscan, Magic in the Water (co-released by TriStar Pictures), The Golden Laws, Steamboy (co-distributed by Destination Films) and the critically panned SuperBabies: Baby Geniuses 2.

1980s

1990s

2000s, 2010s

Notes

References

Sony Pictures Entertainment Motion Picture Group
Mass media companies established in 1982
Film production companies of the United States
Sony Pictures Entertainment
 
1982 establishments in the United States